2015–16 Vijay Hazare Trophy is the 14th season of the Vijay Hazare Trophy, a List A cricket tournament in India. It was contested by 27 domestic cricket teams of India. The final was contested by Delhi and Gujarat. It was only the second time they have played each other in a one-day game. Gujarat won the final by 139 runs to claim their first Vijay Hazare title. They advanced to play in the 2015–16 Deodhar Trophy.

Venues

Teams 
Teams are divided into four groups as follows

Note: H – Host

Fixtures

Group A

Group B

Group C

Group D

Knockout stage
Of the 27 participants, the following 8 teams qualified for the knockout stage:

Quarterfinals

Semifinals

Final

References

External links 
Fixtures at Espncricinfo

Vijay Hazare Trophy
Vijay Hazare Trophy